The 1957 Air Force Falcons football team represented the United States Air Force Academy as an independent during the 1957 NCAA University Division football season. For its first three years, the academy was housed at Lowry Air Force Base, Colorado, adjacent to Denver, until August 1958. Until Falcon Stadium opened in 1962, Air Force played home games at DU Stadium at the University of Denver.

Led by second-year head coach Buck Shaw, it was the third season for the football program. The Falcons finished with a record of 3–6–1.

Air Force did not play Army or Navy this season; Army was first played in 1959 and Navy in 1960.

Schedule

Personnel

References

Air Force
Air Force Falcons football seasons
Air Force Falcons football